Whistleville may refer to the following places in the United States:

Whistleville, Arkansas
Whistleville, Georgia
Whistleville, the site of a ghost town in Macon County, Illinois